Kerry Klostermann (born 19 August 1947) is a Canadian volleyball player. He competed in the men's tournament at the 1976 Summer Olympics.

References

1947 births
Living people
Canadian men's volleyball players
Olympic volleyball players of Canada
Volleyball players at the 1976 Summer Olympics
People from Bethesda, Maryland